Andrey Viktorovich Tarasenko (born 29 January 1975) is a Russian powerlifting competitor who won six world titles between 1999 and 2007.

References

1975 births
Russian powerlifters
Living people
World Games silver medalists
World Games gold medalists
Competitors at the 2001 World Games
Competitors at the 2005 World Games